Luís Carlos Dallastella (born 28 July 1987), known as Luís Carlos, is a Brazilian footballer who plays as a goalkeeper for Mirassol.

References

External links

1987 births
Living people
Footballers from Curitiba
Brazilian footballers
Association football goalkeepers
Campeonato Brasileiro Série B players
Paraná Clube players
Associação Atlética Iguaçu players
Ypiranga Futebol Clube players
Ceará Sporting Club players
Associação Portuguesa de Desportos players
Guarani FC players
Figueirense FC players
Vila Nova Futebol Clube players
Oeste Futebol Clube players
Esporte Clube Juventude players
Mirassol Futebol Clube players